Hugh Forde (born 31 January 1936) is a Northern Irish former amateur footballer who played as a left half, representing Great Britain at the 1960 Summer Olympics. He played club football for  Distillery, Ards and Glenavon, and is the younger brother of Tommy Forde. He later lived in Australia.

References

1936 births
Living people
Association footballers from Belfast
Association footballers from Northern Ireland
Glenavon F.C. players
Ards F.C. players
Lisburn Distillery F.C. players
Footballers at the 1960 Summer Olympics
Olympic footballers of Great Britain
Association football wing halves